DFX2 may refer to:

 DFX2 (band)
 Delta Force: Xtreme 2